is a Japanese football player for Tochigi SC.

Career statistics

Club
Updated to 28 February 2019.

1Includes Emperor's Cup.
2Includes J. League Cup.
3Includes AFC Champions League.

References

External links
Profile at Albirex Niigata
Profile at Nagoya Grampus

1991 births
Living people
People from Seto, Aichi
Association football people from Aichi Prefecture
Japanese footballers
J1 League players
J2 League players
Nagoya Grampus players
Albirex Niigata players
V-Varen Nagasaki players
Tochigi SC players
Association football midfielders